Rüppell's robin-chat (Cossypha semirufa) is a species of bird in the family Muscicapidae, that is native to the Afrotropics. It is named for the German naturalist Eduard Rüppell.

Description
It is a smaller version of the White-browed robin-chat, measuring 18 cm rather than 20  cm, with darker, blackish central tail feathers, and in some races a more constricted supercilium behind the eye.

Range
It is native to Eritrea, Ethiopia, Kenya, South Sudan and Tanzania.

Habitat
It is found in subtropical or tropical moist montane forests, including Juniper and Podocarpus forest, and in subtropical or tropical moist shrubland and gardens.

Races
There are three races:

 Cossypha semirufa semirufa
Range: Eritrea, Ethiopia, south-eastern South Sudan and northern Kenya
 Cossypha semirufa donaldsoni Sharpe, 1895
Description: Rufous collar almost complete, upperparts darker than nominate
Range: south-eastern Ethiopia and adjacent Somalia
 Cossypha semirufa intercedens (Cabanis, 1878)
Range: central to south-eastern Kenya and northern Tanzania

References

Rüppell's robin-chat
Birds of East Africa
Rüppell's robin-chat
Taxonomy articles created by Polbot